Dirty Work is a 1998 American buddy black comedy film directed by Bob Saget. Based on the short story "Vengeance is Mine Inc." by Roald Dahl, the film follows long-time friends Mitch (Norm Macdonald) and Sam (Artie Lange) who start a revenge-for-hire business, and work to fund heart surgery for Sam's father Pops (Jack Warden). When they take on work for an unscrupulous businessman (Christopher McDonald), in order to be paid, they create a revenge scheme of their own. Traylor Howard also stars and notable cameo appearances include Don Rickles, Rebecca Romijn, John Goodman, Gary Coleman, Chevy Chase, David Koechner, Chris Farley (in his final film appearance), and Adam Sandler as Satan.

The film was the first starring vehicle for Macdonald and Lange, and the directorial debut of Saget, coming one year after he left his long-running role as host of America's Funniest Home Videos.

Though Dirty Work received largely negative critical reviews upon its 1998 release and was a financial disappointment, it has since become a cult classic and has been reappraised more positively by some critics. Co-star Artie Lange later became a regular on The Howard Stern Show, where the film was sometimes discussed. A sequel was planned but ultimately canceled following both Macdonald and Saget's deaths in 2021 and 2022 respectively.

Plot 
Growing up, friends Mitch Weaver and Sam McKenna are taught by Sam's hard-nosed father, "Pops" McKenna, not to "take crap from anyone". To that end, the pair plant a bunch of guns in a schoolyard bully's desk and have him arrested for gun possession; next, they catch a kid-fondling crossing guard in the act, after having applied Krazy Glue to the seat of Mitch's pants.

As adults, after losing fourteen jobs in three months and being dumped by his girlfriend, Mitch moves in with Sam and Pops, who then has a heart attack. In the hospital, Pops confides that, because of their parents' swinging lifestyle, he is also Mitch's father, meaning that Mitch and Sam are half-brothers. Even though Pops' heart is failing, Dr. Farthing, a hopeless gambler, will raise Mr. McKenna's position on the transplant waiting list if he is paid $50,000, to save himself from his bookie. Mitch and Sam get jobs in a cinema with an abusive manager and exact their revenge by showing Men In Black (Who Like To Have Sex With Each Other) to a packed house and get their manager fired. The other workers congratulate them and suggest they go into business.

Mitch and Sam open "Dirty Work", a revenge-for-hire business (the Dirty Work phone number is "555-0187", a fictitious number used later on Saturday Night Live.). Mitch falls for a woman named Kathy who works for a shady used car dealer. After publicly embarrassing the dealer during a live television commercial (Mitch: "Here’s another dead hooker in this trunk!"), the duo exacts increasingly lucrative reprisals for satisfied customers until they interfere with unscrupulous local property developer Travis Cole. Cole tricks them into destroying "his" apartment building (actually owned by Mr. John Kirkpatrick, the landlord), promising to pay them enough to save Pops. Afterwards, Cole reneges, revealing that he is not the owner and that he had them vandalize the building so that he could buy it cheaply, evict the tenants (including Kathy's grandmother), and build a parking lot for his beloved opera house. Unknown to Cole, Mitch's "note to self" mini-tape recorder captures this confession.

Mitch and Sam plot their revenge on Cole, using the tape to set up an elaborate trap. Using skunks, a loyal army of prostitutes, homeless men, a noseless friend, brownies with hallucinogenic additives, and Pops, they ruin the opening night of Don Giovanni, an opera sponsored prominently by Cole. With the media present, Mitch plays back Cole's confession over the theater's sound system. Cole sees that his public image is being tarnished and agrees to pay the $50,000. In the end, Cole is punched in the stomach, arrested and jailed, his dog is raped by a skunk, Pops gets his operation, and Mitch gets the girl. Dr. Farthing overcomes his gambling habit, but gets beaten to death by the bookies anyway. "That's it. Bye!"

Cast 
 Norm Macdonald as Mitch Weaver
 Artie Lange as Sam McKenna, Mitch's friend and half-brother
 Jack Warden as Pops McKenna, Sam and Mitch's father
 Traylor Howard as Kathy, Mitch's love interest
 Chris Farley as Jimmy (uncredited), Mitch and Sam's friend
 Christopher McDonald as Travis Cole, real estate magnate
 Chevy Chase as Dr. Farthing, gambling-addicted heart surgeon

Cameo appearances
 Don Rickles as Mr. Hamilton, theater owner
 Rebecca Romijn as bearded lady
 John Goodman as Mayor Adrian Riggins (uncredited)
 Adam Sandler as Satan (uncredited)
 Gary Coleman as himself
 George Chuvalo as ring announcer
 Ken Norton as himself
 David Koechner as Anton Phillips, a used car dealer
 Jim Downey as homeless man
 Fred Wolf as homeless man
 Kevin Farley as theater worker
 Anthony J. Mifsud as Low Life (drug dealer)
 Gord Martineau as reporter
 Chris Gillett as Mr. Witherspoon

Production and release 
Filmed at Wycliffe College and elsewhere around Toronto, Ontario, Canada, the film was produced for an estimated $13 million.

In his first appearance on The Howard Stern Show on September 18, 2008, Chevy Chase discussed the film's production and release with Artie Lange. According to Chase, he was impressed by the original script's raunchy, R-rated, "over the top" tone (particularly a filmed but ultimately cut gag involving Macdonald and Lange delivering donuts that had been photographed around their genitals) and, Lange related, went so far as to beg Macdonald not to allow any changes—to "keep it funny". Lange said the studio insisted on a PG-13 rating and moved the film's release from the February dump months to June, where it fared poorly against blockbusters like Godzilla.

During production, Norm Macdonald was embroiled in a feud with Don Ohlmeyer, then an executive with NBC. Ohlmeyer, a friend of O. J. Simpson, took offense at Macdonald's frequent and pointed jokes about Simpson on Weekend Update and had Macdonald fired from the position. Ohlmeyer went further and refused to sell advertising space or air commercials for Dirty Work. NBC eventually relented (Ohlmeyer was forced into retirement not long afterward) a week after the film premiered.

Dirty Work was Chris Farley's last-released film appearance, filmed before his fatal drug overdose in December 1997.

Norm Macdonald offered Howard Stern the role of Satan but he declined. Adam Sandler was eventually cast instead.

MGM released the film on DVD, in August 1999, and for digital rental/purchase.

Reception 
Critics mostly gave negative reviews. It was referred to as a "leaden, taste-deprived attempted comedy" and "a desert of comedy" with only infrequent humor in The New York Times. The Los Angeles Times described it as "a tone-deaf, scattershot and dispiritingly cheesy affair with more groans than laughs", and though Macdonald "does uncork a few solid one-liners", his lack of conviction in his acting "is amusing in and of itself, but it doesn't help the movie much".
The San Francisco Chronicle recommended the film only for "people who like stupid lowdown vulgar comedy. I had a few good laughs."

It has a 14% critic rating at Rotten Tomatoes, averaged from 28 reviews. The film has been described as a "cult classic". In his column, My Year Of Flops, critic Nathan Rabin describes Dirty Work as an example of "the ironic dumb comedy, the slyly postmodern lowbrow gag-fest that so lustily, nakedly embraces and exposes the machinations and conventions of stupid laffers that it becomes a sort of sublime bit of meta-comedy".

Discussed sequel 
When asked about a sequel in 2018, Macdonald stated "It was an R-rated movie, so we made it that way, then they made it [PG-13], so half the movie had to be cut. So it's hard for me to see it objectively. There might be another one coming now, I guess." Macdonald did not elaborate further regarding the potential sequel. Bob Saget spoke about the sequel in May 2021 in an interview with Kevin Hart on his podcast, "Comedy Gold Minds". Hart praised the film's moments and innovations, to which Saget replied, "you want to be in the sequel, we're making it?". Hart said he would do a cameo without hesitation, declaring Dirty Work to be one of his favorite movies of all time. Macdonald died four months later in September 2021, essentially ending talks of a sequel, followed soon after by Saget’s death in January 2022.

References

External links 

 
 
 
 
 
 
 
 https://www.forbes.com/sites/scottking/2018/09/10/norm-macdonald-on-new-show-burt-reynolds-dirty-work-2-and-louis-c-k/#255ce9572ca9

1998 films
1998 comedy films
1998 directorial debut films
1990s buddy comedy films
American buddy comedy films
American films about revenge
Films about skunks
Films directed by Bob Saget
Films scored by Richard Gibbs
American black comedy films
Films shot in Toronto
Films with screenplays by Fred Wolf
Metro-Goldwyn-Mayer films
Norm Macdonald
1990s English-language films
1990s American films